Belgium was represented by Ingeborg, with the song "Door de wind", at the 1989 Eurovision Song Contest, which took place in Lausanne, Switzerland on 6 May. Ingeborg was the winner of the Belgian national final for the contest, held in Brussels on 18 March.

Before Eurovision

Eurosong 1989 
Flemish broadcaster BRT was in charge of the selection of the Belgian entry for the 1989 Contest. The national final was held at the Amerikaans Theater in Brussels, hosted by Luc Appermont. Twelve songs competed to become that year's Belgian entrant, voted on by regional juries in the five Flemish provinces of Belgium, alongside a professional jury. Ingeborg emerged the winner by a 13-point margin, having received the highest overall score both from the regional juries and the professional jury.

Voting

At Eurovision 
On the night of the final Ingeborg performed 6th in the running order, following Turkey and preceding the United Kingdom. At the close of the voting "Door de wind" had received 13 points, placing Belgium 19th out of 22 entries. The Belgian jury awarded its 12 points to Austria.

Voting

References

External links 
 Belgian Preselection 1989

1989
Countries in the Eurovision Song Contest 1989
Eurovision